Nena were a German Neue Deutsche Welle band formed in West Berlin in 1981. In 1983 and 1984, their German-language song "99 Luftballons" (and its English version, "99 Red Balloons") reached number one in the singles charts of countries around the world.

History

Formation and rise
The band was formed in 1982 when vocalist Gabriele Kerner (Nena) came to West Berlin with drummer Rolf Brendel, her boyfriend at the time. There they assembled the other members of the band, which took its name from their lead singer's nickname (Spanish for "little girl"), which she had acquired as a toddler during a family holiday to Spain.

The band wrote all of their songs themselves, typically working in pairs. They became overnight sensations in Germany when they performed their debut single "Nur geträumt" on German TV in August 1982, Nena herself wearing a distinctive short red miniskirt. The single reached number 2 in the German charts, a position it occupied for 6 weeks, and also climbed high in the Austrian, Belgian, Dutch and Swiss charts. In early 1983 the follow-up single "99 Luftballons" spent a further 7 weeks at number 2 before finally reaching the top slot, a position the debut album matched.

By the time the band released its second album ? (Fragezeichen) in Germany in January 1984, "99 Luftballons" was starting to climb the US charts, where it reached number 2 and became one of the most successful non-English-language tracks in US Billboard chart history. With the English version of the song ("99 Red Balloons") achieving the number 1 position in the UK, the band became internationally famous and in 1984 gave concerts and made TV appearances in Scandinavia, the UK, Spain and France as well as a 7-date tour (on consecutive nights) of Japan. An international album 99 Luftballons which comprised a combination of English and German versions of tracks from the first two German albums, performed respectably, reaching number 31 in the UK charts in mid-1984.

Whilst enjoying international prominence on the back of "99 Luftballons", the band continued to enjoy domestic success in Germany with a string of hits in 1984 and the first half of 1985. The ? (Fragezeichen) album matched the band's debut album in making it to the top spot and spawned two of the band's best-known and most successful singles (the title track and "Rette mich"). They also had success with a couple of songs which would eventually be included on their third studio album, Feuer und Flamme, most notably "Irgendwie, irgendwo, irgendwann".

Decline and discontinuation
The band was unable to follow up the international success of "99 Luftballons". An English version of "Nur geträumt" ("Just a Dream") failed to make the Billboard Hot 100 and only reached number 70 in the UK charts. A second English album (It's All in the Game, an English version of Feuer und Flamme) failed to chart.

The band's fortunes in its homeland also began to turn in the second half of 1985, with disappointing attendance levels at their concerts and their successful chart run ending when the last two singles from Feuer und Flamme failed to chart.

The band's fourth and final studio album Eisbrecher ("Icebreaker"), apparently so named because it was intended to smash the mounting indifference the band was encountering, was released in late 1986. Relative to its three predecessors it was a commercial failure as were the two last singles released from the album. Without ever formally announcing a breakup, the band discontinued in 1987. In the same year the marriage of Nena's sister to the band's bassist Jürgen Dehmel ended in divorce and Nena's 8-year relationship with the band's drummer, Rolf Brendel, also ended.

Epilogue
After a break from the music scene during which she starred in a film and had a baby boy who died at the age of 11 months, Nena launched her solo career in 1989 going on to enjoy considerable success in Germany, Austria and Switzerland, particularly since 2002 when she re-recorded the band's biggest successes, newly arranged and produced by her former band colleague and composer of most of the band's hit songs, Uwe Fahrenkrog-Petersen. Since the birth of her fifth and final child in 1997, she has toured Germany more or less constantly, at least 50% of her concert setlists typically comprising tracks from the Nena band era.

Throughout her solo career, Nena has continued to collaborate with former band members. Firstly, Nena's former boyfriend, Rolf Brendel, supported her as a drummer in the Bongo Girl tour in 1993. Most enduring has been the link with the band's former keyboard player Uwe Fahrenkrog-Petersen who appeared with her on stage during the 2005 tour promoting the triple-gold achieving Willst du mit mir gehn album which he had also produced and co-written the singles for. He also collaborated with Nena for the 2009 album Made in Germany, which also achieved gold status. The band's former guitarist, Carlo Karges, also wrote tracks for some of Nena's solo albums in the 1990s. He died in 2002, just months before all the band's surviving members reunited on stage to perform "Leuchtturm" during Nena's triumphant Frankfurt concert which coincided with the release of the triple-platinum Nena feat. Nena album which regalvanised her solo career.

The surviving members next publicly reunited in 2017 to perform "Nur geträumt" in a television programme marking the 40th anniversary of Nena's first stage appearance.

Members
 Gabriele Susanne Kerner (Nena) – lead vocals
 Carlo Karges (died 2002) – guitar, backing vocals
 Jürgen Dehmel – bass, Chapman Stick, keyboards, synthesizer
 Rolf Brendel – drums, percussion
 Uwe Fahrenkrog-Petersen – keyboards, synthesizers, keytar, backing and lead vocals

Discography

Studio albums

International albums
Following the international success of the single "99 Luftballons", the band released 99 Luftballons, a compilation of tracks from its first two albums, with five of the songs in new English-language versions. It's All in the Game is the English-language version of Feuer und Flamme, with lyrics by Canadian singer Lisa Dalbello.

Singles

Promotional singles

References

External links
 

Musical groups established in 1981
Musical groups disestablished in 1987
CBS Records artists
Columbia Records artists
Epic Records artists
German new wave musical groups
German pop music groups
Neue Deutsche Welle groups
Musical groups from Berlin
Female-fronted musical groups